is a former Japanese football player.

Playing career
Tanada was born in Hiroshima on July 25, 1969. After graduating from Juntendo University, he joined Japan Football League club Hitachi (later Kashiwa Reysol) in 1992. He played many matches as offensive midfielder from first season. The club was promoted to J1 League from 1995 and he became a regular player in 1995 season. However he got hurt in late the season. Although he came back in 1996 season, his opportunity to play decreased. In October 1998, he moved to Consadole Sapporo. Although he played many matches for the club, he retired end of 1999 season.

Club statistics

References

External links

1969 births
Living people
Juntendo University alumni
Association football people from Hiroshima Prefecture
Japanese footballers
J1 League players
J2 League players
Japan Football League (1992–1998) players
Kashiwa Reysol players
Hokkaido Consadole Sapporo players
Association football midfielders